The 2020–21 Scottish League Cup (also known as the Betfred Cup for sponsorship reasons) was the 75th season of Scotland's second-most prestigious football knockout competition.

The format for the 2020–21 competition was the same as the previous four seasons.

It began with eight groups of five teams including all 2019–20 Scottish Professional Football League (SPFL) clubs, excluding those competing in Champions League and Europa League qualifiers, as well as the winners of the 2019–20 Highland Football League (Brora Rangers) and the 2019–20 Lowland Football League (Kelty Hearts).

The domestic broadcasting rights for the competition were held exclusively by Premier Sports.

St Johnstone were the winners of the Scottish League Cup, beating Livingston 1–0 in the final. It was the second major trophy in their history, after the 2014 Scottish Cup. They became the first team in nearly five years to win a Scottish domestic trophy other than Celtic.

Schedule

Format
The competition began with eight groups of five teams. The four clubs competing in the UEFA Champions League (Celtic) and Europa League (Rangers, Motherwell, and Aberdeen) qualifying rounds were given a bye through to the second round. The 40 teams competing in the group stage consisted of the other eight teams that competed in the 2019–20 Scottish Premiership, and all of the teams that competed in the 2019–20 Scottish Championship, 2019–20 Scottish League One and 2019–20 Scottish League Two. The 2019–20 Highland Football League and the 2019–20 Lowland Football League champions also competed.

The winners of each of the eight groups, as well as the four best runners-up progressed to the second round (last 16), which included the four UEFA qualifying clubs. At this stage, the competition reverts to the traditional knock-out format. The four group winners with the highest points total and the clubs entering at this stage were seeded, with the four group winners with the lowest points unseeded along with the four best runners-up.

Bonus point system
In December 2015, the SPFL announced that alongside the new group stage format, a bonus point system would be introduced to provide greater excitement and increase the number of meaningful games at this stage. The traditional point system of awarding three points for a win and one point for a draw is used, however, for each group stage match that finishes in a draw, a penalty shoot-out takes place, with the winner being awarded a bonus point.

Group stage

The group stage was made up of eight teams from the 2019–20 Scottish Premiership, and all ten teams from each of the 2019–20 Scottish Championship, 2019–20 Scottish League One and 2019–20 Scottish League Two, as well as the winners of the 2019–20 Highland Football League and 2019–20 Lowland Football League. The 40 teams were divided into two sections – North and South – with each section containing four top seeds, four second seeds and 12 unseeded teams. Each section was drawn into four groups with each group comprising one top seed, one second seed and three unseeded teams.

The draw for the group stage took place on 10 August 2020 and was broadcast live FreeSports & the SPFL YouTube channel.

North

Group A

Group B

Group C

Group D

South

Group E

Group F

Group G

Group H

Best runners-up

Knockout phase

Second round

Draw and seeding
Aberdeen, Celtic, Motherwell and Rangers entered the competition at this stage, after receiving a bye for the group stage due to their participation in UEFA club competitions.

The four UEFA-qualifying clubs and the four group winners with the best record were seeded for the draw.

The draw for the second round took place on 15 November 2020 following the Hibernian v Dundee match live on Premier Sports 1.

Teams in Bold advanced to the quarter-finals.

Notes
† denotes teams playing in the Championship.
* denotes team playing in League One.

Matches

Quarter-final

Draw

The quarter-final draw took place on 29 November 2020 following the Falkirk v Rangers match live on Premier Sports 1.

Teams in Bold advanced to the semi-finals.

Matches

Semi-final

Draw

The draw for the semi-finals took place on 16 December 2020 following the St Mirren v Rangers match live on Premier Sports 1.

Teams in Bold advanced to the final.

Matches

Final

Top goalscorers

Source:

Media coverage
The domestic broadcasting rights for the competition are held exclusively by Premier Sports who will broadcast between 12 and 16 Betfred Cup live matches per season as well as highlights.

The following matches were broadcast live on UK television:

References

Scottish League Cup seasons
League Cup
League Cup